Great Park may refer to:

 Places in England
 Great Park, Longbridge, Birmingham
 Newcastle Great Park, Newcastle upon Tyne
 Windsor Great Park, Berkshire

 Places in the United States
 Great Park, Irvine, California